The 2021–22 Taoyuan Pilots season was the franchise's 2nd season, its second season in the P. LEAGUE+ (PLG), its 2nd in Taoyuan City. The Pilots were coached by Cheng Chih-Lung in his first year as head coach.

On March 23, the Pilots announced that Cheng Chih-Lung resigned as head coach. On March 25, the Pilots named Yen Hsing-Su as their interim head coach.

Draft 

The Pilots' 2021 first-round draft pick was traded to New Taipei Kings in exchange for 2022 first-round draft pick. However, the Pilots doesn't select any player on 2021 P. League+ draft.

Standings

Roster

Game log

Preseason

Regular season

Player Statistics 
<noinclude>

Regular season

 Reference：

Transactions

Trades

Free Agency

Re-signed

Additions

Subtractions

Awards

End-of-Season Awards

Players of the Week

References 

Taoyuan Pilots seasons
Taoyuan Pilots